Conrad Peter Laar (22 March 1853 – 11 February 1929) was a German chemist. He coined the expression tautomerism in 1885.

References

1853 births
1929 deaths
19th-century German chemists
Scientists from Hamburg
Academic staff of the University of Bonn
20th-century German chemists